Abdulla Abuqrais (born 13 March 1959) is a Kuwaiti diver. He competed in the 1984 Summer Olympics.

References

External links
 

1959 births
Living people
Divers at the 1984 Summer Olympics
Kuwaiti male divers
Olympic divers of Kuwait